Újezdec may refer to places in the Czech Republic:
 
Újezdec (Jindřichův Hradec District) 
Újezdec (Mělník District) 
Újezdec (Prachatice District) 
Újezdec (Svitavy District) 
Újezdec (Uherské Hradiště District)